The York Medal is an annual, regiment wide, commemorative medal presented to an individual from the British Army's Yorkshire Regiment who has been considered to have made the greatest contribution to the aims of the Regiment over the course of the previous year.

Medal 
The Yorkshire Regiment Medal is circular in shape.

 Obverse: the badge of the Yorkshire Regiment with the inscription THE YORKSHIRE REGIMENT.
 Ribbon: a broad central red stripe, flanked each side by a stripe of black, with an outer stripe of khaki green, the regimental colours.

List of recipients 
2020: Captain Tom Moore, veteran of 8th Battalion, Duke of Wellington's Regiment
2021: Sergeant Chris Clarke, 4th Battalion
2022: WO1 (RSM) Steven Greenwood, 2nd Battalion, The Yorkshire Regiment.

References

Military awards and decorations of the United Kingdom
medal